Michael John Moorcock (born 18 December 1939) is an English writer, particularly of science fiction and fantasy, who has published a number of well-received literary novels as well as comic thrillers, graphic novels and non-fiction. He has worked as an editor and is also a successful musician. He is best known for his novels about the character Elric of Melniboné, which were a seminal influence on the field of fantasy in the 1960s and '70s.

As editor of the British science fiction magazine New Worlds, from May 1964 until March 1971 and then again from 1976 to 1996, Moorcock fostered the development of the science fiction "New Wave" in the UK and indirectly in the United States, leading to the advent of cyberpunk. His publication of Bug Jack Barron (1969) by Norman Spinrad as a serial novel was notorious; in Parliament, some British MPs condemned the Arts Council of Great Britain for funding the magazine. He is also a recording musician, contributing to the bands Hawkwind, Blue Öyster Cult, Robert Calvert, Spirits Burning, and his own project, Michael Moorcock & The Deep Fix.

In 2008, The Times named Moorcock in its list of "The 50 greatest British writers since 1945".

Biography
Michael Moorcock was born in London in December 1939, and the landscape of London, particularly the area of Notting Hill Gate and Ladbroke Grove, is an important influence in some of his fiction (such as the Cornelius novels).

Moorcock has mentioned The Mastermind of Mars by Edgar Rice Burroughs, The Apple Cart by George Bernard Shaw and The Constable of St. Nicholas by Edwin Lester Arnold as the first three non-juvenile books that he read before beginning primary school. The first book he bought was a secondhand copy of The Pilgrim's Progress.

Moorcock is the former husband of the writer Hilary Bailey by whom he had three children: Sophie b.1963, Katherine b.1964, and Max b. 1972. He is also the former husband of Jill Riches, who later married Robert Calvert. She illustrated some of Moorcock's books, including covers, among them the dustjacket for the first edition of Gloriana (Allison and Busby, 1978). In 1983, Linda Steele became Moorcock's third wife.

He was an early member of the Swordsmen and Sorcerers' Guild of America (SAGA), a loose-knit group of eight heroic fantasy authors founded in the 1960s and led by Lin Carter,  selected by fantasy credentials alone.

Moorcock is the subject of four book-length works, a monograph and an interview, by Colin Greenland. In 1983, Greenland published The Entropy Exhibition: Michael Moorcock and the British 'New Wave' in Science Fiction. He followed this with Michael Moorcock: Death is No Obstacle, a book-length interview about technique, in 1992. Michael Moorcock: Law of Chaos by Jeff Gardiner and Michael Moorcock: Fiction, Fantasy and the World's Pain by Mark Scroggins were published more recently.

In the 1990s, Moorcock moved to Texas in the United States. His wife Linda is American. He spends half of the year in Texas, the other half in Paris.

Political views

Moorcock's works feature political content. In one interview, he states, "I am an anarchist and a pragmatist. My moral/philosophical position is that of an anarchist." In describing how his writing relates to his political philosophy, Moorcock says, "My books frequently deal with aristocratic heroes, gods and so forth. All of them end on a note which often states quite directly that one should serve neither gods nor masters but become one's own master."

Besides using fiction to explore his politics, Moorcock also engages in political activism. In order to "marginalize stuff that works to objectify women and suggests women enjoy being beaten", he has encouraged W H Smiths to move John Norman's Gor series novels to the top shelf.

Writer

Fiction
Moorcock began writing while he was still at school, contributing to a magazine he entitled Outlaw's Own from 1950 on.

In 1957, at the age of 17, Moorcock became editor of   Tarzan Adventures (a national juvenile weekly featuring text and Tarzan comic strip), which had published at least a dozen of his own "Sojan the Swordsman" stories during that year and the next. At age 18 (in 1958), he wrote the allegorical fantasy novel The Golden Barge. This remained unpublished until 1980, when it was issued by Savoy Books with an introduction by M. John Harrison. At 19,  Moorcock worked on The Sexton Blake Library (serial pulp fiction featuring Sexton Blake, the poor man's Sherlock Holmes). 

Under Moorcock's leadership, New Worlds became central to "New Wave" science fiction. This movement, not of its own naming, promoted individual vision, literary style and an existential view of technological change, in contrast to generic "hard science fiction", which extrapolated on technological change itself. Some "New Wave" stories were not recognisable as traditional science fiction, and New Worlds remained controversial for as long as Moorcock edited it.  Moorcock claimed that he wanted to publish experimental/literary fiction using techniques and subject matter from generic SF but, initially at least, to marry "popular" and "literary" fiction at what he considered their natural overlap. After 1967, this policy became evident and allied to the British "pop art" movement exemplified by Eduardo Paolozzi, Richard Hamilton and others. Paolozzi became "Aviation Editor". 

During that time, he occasionally wrote as "James Colvin", a "house pseudonym" originally created for him by John Carnell also used by other New Worlds critics. A spoof obituary of Colvin appeared in New Worlds #197 (January 1970), written by Charles Platt as "William Barclay". Moorcock makes much use of the initials "JC"; these are also the initials of Jesus Christ, the subject of his 1967 Nebula Award-winning novella Behold the Man, which tells the story of Karl Glogauer, a time-traveller who takes on the role of Christ. They are also the initials of various "Eternal Champion" Moorcock characters such as Jerry Cornelius, Jerry Cornell and Jherek Carnelian. In more recent years, Moorcock has taken to using "Warwick Colvin, Jr." as a pseudonym, particularly in his "Second Ether" fiction.

Moorcock talks about much of his writing in Death Is No Obstacle with Colin Greenland, which is a book-length transcription of interviews with Moorcock about the techniques in his writing.

Moorcock has also published pastiches of writers for whom he felt affection as a boy, including Edgar Rice Burroughs, Leigh Brackett, and Robert E. Howard. All his fantasy adventures have elements of satire and parody, while respecting what he considers the essentials of the form. Although his heroic fantasies have been his most consistently reprinted books in the United States, he achieved prominence in the UK as a literary author, with the Guardian Fiction Prize in 1977 for The Condition of Muzak, and with Mother London later shortlisted for the Whitbread Prize.

Novels and series such as the Cornelius Quartet, Mother London, King of the City, the Pyat Quartet and the short story collection London Bone have established him in the eyes of critics such as Iain Sinclair, Peter Ackroyd and Allan Massie in publications including The Times Literary Supplement and the London Review of Books as a major contemporary literary novelist. In 2008 Moorcock was named by a critics' panel in The Times as one of the fifty best British novelists since 1945. Virtually all of his stories are part of his overarching "Eternal Champion" theme or oeuvre, with characters (including Elric) moving from one storyline and fictional universe to another, all of them interconnected (though often only in dreams or visions).

Most of Moorcock's earlier work consisted of short stories and relatively brief novels: he has mentioned that "I could write 15,000 words a day and gave myself three days a volume. That's how, for instance, the Hawkmoon books were written." Over the period of the New Worlds editorship and his publishing of the original fantasy novels Moorcock has maintained an interest in the craft of writing and a continuing interest in the semi-journalistic craft of "pulp" authorship. This is reflected in his development of interlocking cycles which hark back to the origins of fantasy in myth and medieval cycles (see "Wizardry and Wild Romance – Moorcock" and "Death Is No Obstacle – Colin Greenland" for more commentary). This also provides an implicit link with the episodic origins of literature in newspaper/magazine serials from Trollope and Dickens onwards. None of this should be surprising given Moorcock's background in magazine publishing.

Since the 1980s, Moorcock has written longer, more literary "mainstream" novels, such as Mother London and Byzantium Endures, but he continued to revisit characters from his earlier works, such as Elric. With the publication of the third and last book in  his Elric Moonbeam Roads sequence,  he announced that he was "retiring" from writing heroic fantasy fiction, though he continued to write Elric's adventures as graphic novels with his long-time collaborators Walter Simonson and the late James Cawthorn (1929–2008)  and in 2021 announced that he had written a 'straight' Elric novel, within the first canon, for the 60th anniversary of his hero's appearance. He and Simonson   produced the graphic novel, Elric: the Making of a Sorcerer, published by DC Comics in 2007. In 2006, he completed his highly praised Colonel Pyat sequence, dealing with the Nazi Holocaust. This began in 1981 with Byzantium Endures, continued through The Laughter of Carthage (1984) and Jerusalem Commands (1992), and culminated with The Vengeance of Rome (2006).  His most recent sequence, KABOUL, with illustrations by Miles Hyman, was published in French by Denoel.

Among other works by Moorcock are The Dancers at the End of Time, comedies set on Earth millions of years in the future, Gloriana, or The Unfulfill'd Queen, which he describes as an argument with Spenser's The Faerie Queen, set in an alternative Earth history and the "Second Ether" sequence beginning with "BLOOD", mixing absurdism, reminiscence and family memoir against the background of his multiverse.

Moorcock is prone to revising his existing work, with the result that different editions of a given book may contain significant variations. The changes range from simple retitlings (the Elric story The Flame Bringers became The Caravan of Forgotten Dreams in the 1990s Victor Gollancz/White Wolf omnibus editions) to character name changes (such as detective "Minos Aquilinas" becoming first "Minos von Bek" and later "Sam Begg" in three different versions of the short story "The Pleasure Garden of Felipe Sagittarius"), major textual alterations (for example, the addition of several new chapters to The Steel Tsar in the omnibus editions), and even complete restructurings (as with the 1966 novella Behold the Man being expanded to novel-length and into a novel rather than an SF story recreated from the original version that appeared in New Worlds for republication as a book in 1969 by Allison and Busby).

A new, final revision of almost Moorcock's entire oeuvre, with the exception of his literary novels Mother London, King of the City and the Pyat quartet, is issued by Gollancz and many of his titles are  reprinted in the United States by Simon and Schuster and Titan and in France by Gallimard. Many novels and comics based on his work are being reprinted by Titan Books under the general title The Michael Moorcock Library, while in France a new adaptation of the Elric and Hawkmoon series has been translated into many languages, including English.

Elric of Melniboné and the Eternal Champion

Moorcock's best-selling works have been the "Elric of Melniboné" stories. In these, Elric is a deliberate reversal of clichés found in fantasy adventure novels inspired by the works of J. R. R. Tolkien.

Central to many of his seminal fantasy novels, including his Elric books, is the concept of an "Eternal Champion", who has multiple identities across alternate universes. This cosmology is called the "Multiverse" within his novels. The Multiverse deals with primal polarities such as...  (Miltonic) Law and Chaos, and order and entropy.

Elric's success has overshadowed Moorcock's other works, though he has worked the Elric stories' themes into his other works (the "Hawkmoon" and "Corum" novels, for example). His Eternal Champion sequence has been collected in two different editions of omnibus volumes totaling 16 books (the U.S. edition was 15 volumes, while the British edition was 14 volumes, but due to various rights issues, the U.S. edition contained two volumes that were not included in the British edition, and the British edition likewise contained one volume that was not included in the U.S. edition) containing several books per volume, by Victor Gollancz in the UK and by White Wolf Publishing in the US. Several attempts to make an Elric film were made. Moorcock refused to resign the options, usually when they seemed to drift too far off course. In February 2019, BBC Studios announced they had secured the rights to the Runestaff series of fantasy novels, which feature Hawkmoon as their hero.

Jerry Cornelius

Another of Moorcock's creations is Jerry Cornelius, a hip urban adventurer of ambiguous gender; the same characters featured in each of several Cornelius books. These books were satirical of modern times, including the Vietnam War, and continued to feature another variation of the multiverse theme. The first Jerry Cornelius book, The Final Programme (1968), was made into a feature film in 1973. Its story line is identical to two of the Elric stories: The Dreaming City and The Dead Gods' Book. Since 1998, Moorcock has returned to Cornelius in a series of new stories: The Spencer Inheritance, The Camus Connection, Cheering for the Rockets, and Firing the Cathedral, which was concerned with 9/11. All four novellas were included in the 2003 edition of The Lives and Times of Jerry Cornelius. Moorcock's most recent Cornelius stories, "Modem Times", appeared in The Solaris Book of New Science Fiction: Volume 2, published in 2008, this was expanded in 2011 as "Modem Times 2.0". Additionally, a version of Cornelius also appeared in Moorcock's 2010 Doctor Who novel The Coming of the Terraphiles. Pegging the President (PS. 2018), The Fracking Factory (on FB, 2018) are two recent novellas and further stories are forthcoming.

Views on fiction writing

Moorcock is a fervent supporter of Mervyn Peake's works. 

Moorcock is dismissive of J. R. R. Tolkien's works. He met both Tolkien and C. S. Lewis in his teens and claims to have liked them personally even though he does not admire them on artistic grounds. Moorcock criticised works such as The Lord of the Rings for their "Merry England" point of view, equating Tolkien's novel to Winnie-the-Pooh in his essay Epic Pooh. Even so, James Cawthorn and Moorcock included The Lord of the Rings in Fantasy: The 100 Best Books (Carroll & Graf, 1988), and their review is not dismissive.

Moorcock has also criticized writers for their political agendas. He included Robert A. Heinlein and H. P. Lovecraft among this group in a 1978 essay, "Starship Stormtroopers" (Anarchist Review). There he criticised the production of "authoritarian" fiction by certain canonical writers and Lovecraft for having antisemitic, misogynistic, and racist viewpoints woven into his short stories.

Sharing fictional universes with others

Moorcock has allowed other writers to create stories in his fictional Jerry Cornelius universe. Brian Aldiss, Hilary Bailey, M. John Harrison, Norman Spinrad, James Sallis, and Steve Aylett have written such stories. In an interview published in The Internet Review of Science Fiction, Moorcock explains the reason for sharing his character:

Two short stories by Keith Roberts, "Coranda" and "The Wreck of the Kissing Bitch", are set in the frozen Matto Grosso plateau of Moorcock's 1969 novel, The Ice Schooner.

Elric of Melnibone and Moonglum appear in Karl Edward Wagner's story "The Gothic Touch", where they meet with Kane, who borrows Elric for his ability to deal with demons.
 
He is a friend and fan of comic book writer Alan Moore and allowed Moore the use of his own character, Michael Kane of Old Mars, mentioned in Moore's The League of Extraordinary Gentlemen, Volume II. The two appeared on stage at the Vanbrugh Theatre in London in January 2006 where they discussed Moorcock's work. The Green City from Warriors of Mars was also referenced in Larry Niven's Rainbow Mars. Moorcock's character Jerry Cornelius appeared in Moore's The League of Extraordinary Gentlemen, Volume III: Century.

Cornelius also appeared in French artist Mœbius' comic series Le Garage Hermétique.

In 1995–96, Moorcock wrote a script for a computer game/film/novel by Origin Systems. When Electronic Arts bought Origins, the game was cancelled, but Moorcock's 40,000-word treatment was fleshed out by Storm Constantine, resulting in the novel Silverheart. The story is set in Karadur-Shriltasi, a city at the heart of the Multiverse. A second novel, Dragonskin, was in preparation, with Constantine as the main writer, but she died in January 2021, after a long illness. Moorcock abandoned a memoir about his friends Mervyn Peake and Maeve Gilmore because he felt it was too personal.

He wrote prose and verse for The Sunday Books first publication in French to accompany a set of unpublished Peake drawings. His book The Metatemporal Detective was published in 2007. His most recent book published first in French is Kaboul, in 2018.

In November 2009, Moorcock announced that he would be writing a Doctor Who novel for BBC Books in 2010, one of the few occasions when he has written stories set in other people's "shared universes". The novel The Coming of the Terraphiles was released in October 2010. The story merges Doctor Who with many of Moorcock's characters from the multiverse, notably Captain Cornelius and his pirates. In 2016 Moorcock published the first novel in what he terms a literary experiment blending memoir and fantasy, The Whispering Swarm.  In 2018, he announced his completion of the second volume The Woods of Arcady. In 2020, he said he was completing the final Elric novel The Citadel of Lost Dragons ready for Elric's 60th anniversary in 2021. Moorcock's Jerry Cornelius novella Pegging the President was launched in 2018 at Shakespeare and Co, Paris, where he discussed his work with Hari Kunzru and reaffirmed his commitment to literary experiment.

Audiobooks

The first of an audiobook series of unabridged Elric novels, with new work read by Moorcock, began appearing from AudioRealms; however, Audio Realms is no longer in business. The second audiobook in the series – The Sailor on the Seas of Fate – was published in 2007.  There have been audio-books of Corum and others, several of which were unofficial and A Winter Admiral and Furniture are audio versions of short stories. Since then The Whispering Swarm and the Corum books became available via Audible and all the Elric books were scheduled to appear in audio form to coincide with Simon and Schuster's new illustrated set in 2022.

Music

Michael Moorcock & The Deep Fix

Moorcock has his own music project, which records under the name Michael Moorcock & The Deep Fix. The Deep Fix was the title story of an obscure collection of short stories by James Colvin (a pen name of Moorcock) and was the name of the Jerry Cornelius band. Moorcock's story had dealt with releasing the unconscious and although referencing William Burroughs had no specific illicit drug meaning.  This allegedly lost the band considerable airplay and gave Moorcock what he called 'a great reputation in the drug community' but made venues and stations wary of booking and playing them.  
The first album New Worlds Fair was released in 1975. The album included Snowy White, Peter Pavli of The Third Ear Band, regulars Steve Gilmore and Graham Charnock. Moorcock himself on guitars, mandolin and banjo, and a number of Hawkwind regulars in the credits. A second version of the New Worlds album was issued in 2004 under the album name Roller Coaster Holiday. A non-album rock single, including Lemmy on bass and Moorcock playing his own Rickenbacker 330/12, "Starcruiser" coupled with "Dodgem Dude", was belatedly issued in 1980 on Flicknife. 

Although announced to appear at Dingwalls, the performance was cancelled when schedules clashed. The Deep Fix gave a rare live performance at the Roundhouse, London on 18 June 1978 at Nik Turner's Bohemian Love-In, headlined by Turner's band Sphynx and also featuring Tanz Der Youth with Brian James (ex-The Damned), Lightning Raiders, Steve Took's Horns, Roger Ruskin and others.  

In 1982, as a trio with Peter Pavli and Drachen Theaker, some Deep Fix recordings were issued on Hawkwind, Friends and Relations and a limited-edition 7" single of "Brothel in Rosenstrasse" backed with "Time Centre", which featured Langdon Jones on piano.
In 2008, The Entropy Tango & Gloriana Demo Sessions by Michael Moorcock & The Deep Fix was released. These were sessions for planned albums based on two of Moorcock's novels, Gloriana, or The Unfulfill'd Queen and The Entropy Tango, which were never completed. Pavli, Moorcock and Falcone are currently in the process of making the intended versions of those songs based on the group's TEAC recordings of the 80s.  They are influenced heavily by modern classical music which they look to for inspiration. Moorcock's considerable range is demanded. Moorcock and Pavli have long been advocates for Mahler, Schoenberg, Ives and other 20th century composers.

Working with Martin Stone, Moorcock began recording a new Deep Fix album in Paris, titled Live at the Terminal Cafe. Following Stone's death in 2016, Moorcock made plans to complete the album with producer Don Falcone. In 2019, Moorcock announced the completion of the album, and it was released 11 October 2019, on Cleopatra Records.

With Hawkwind

Moorcock collaborated with the British rock band Hawkwind on many occasions: the Hawkwind track "The Black Corridor", for example, included verbatim quotes from Moorcock's novel of the same name, and he worked with the band on their album Warrior on the Edge of Time, for which he earned a gold disc. Moorcock also wrote the lyrics to "Sonic Attack", a Sci-Fi satire of the public information broadcast, that was part of Hawkwind's Space Ritual set. Hawkwind's album The Chronicle of the Black Sword was largely based on the Elric novels. Moorcock appeared on stage with the band on many occasions, including the Black Sword tour. His contributions were removed from the original release of the Live Chronicles album, recorded on this tour, for legal reasons, but have subsequently appeared on some double-CD versions. He can also be seen performing on the DVD version of Chronicle of the Black Sword.

With Robert Calvert

Moorcock also collaborated with former Hawkwind frontman and resident poet, Robert Calvert (who gave the chilling declamation of "Sonic Attack"), on Calvert's albums Lucky Leif and the Longships and Hype, playing guitar and banjo and singing background vocals with his wife Linda.

With Blue Öyster Cult

Moorcock wrote the lyrics to three album tracks by the American band Blue Öyster Cult: "Black Blade", referring to the sword Stormbringer in the Elric books, "Veteran of the Psychic Wars", showing us Elric's emotions at a critical point of his story (this song may also refer to the "Warriors at the Edge of Time", which figure heavily in Moorcock's novels about John Daker; at one point his novel The Dragon in the Sword they call themselves the "veterans of a thousand psychic wars"), and "The Great Sun Jester", about his friend, the poet Bill Butler, who died of a drug overdose. Moorcock has performed live with BÖC (in 1987 at the Atlanta, GA Dragon Con Convention).

With Spirits Burning

Moorcock contributed vocals and harmonica to the Spirits Burning albums An Alien Heat and The Hollow Lands. Most of the lyrics were taken from or based on text in novels from Moorcock's The Dancers At The End Of Time trilogy. The albums were produced by Spirits Burning leader Don Falcone, and included contributions from Albert Bouchard and other members of Blue Öyster Cult, as well as former members of Hawkwind.

Moorcock plays harmonica on three songs on the 2021 Spirits Burning album Evolution Ritual.

Moorcock also appeared on five tracks on the Spirits Burning CD Alien Injection, released in 2008. He is credited with singing lead vocals and playing glockenspiel, guitar and mandolin. The performances used on the CD were from The Entropy Tango & Gloriana Demo Sessions.

Other appearances

Moorcock's last public appearance as a music performer was with Nik Turner and Flame Tree in Austin, Texas, March 2019.

Moorcock is currently writing songs for Alan Davey and other old-time collaborators.

Awards and honours
Michael Moorcock has received great recognition for his career contributions as well as for particular works.

The Science Fiction and Fantasy Hall of Fame inducted Moorcock in 2002  He also received life achievement awards at the World Fantasy Convention in 2000 (World Fantasy Award), at the Utopiales International Festival in 2004 (Prix Utopia), from the Horror Writers Association in 2005 (Bram Stoker Award), and from the Science Fiction and Fantasy Writers of America in 2008 (named its 25th Grand Master). He is a Parisian  member of the London College of Pataphysicians.

 1993: British Fantasy Society Special Committee Award for contribution to the genre
 2000: World Fantasy Award for Life Achievement
 2004: Prix Utopiales "Grandmaster" Lifetime Achievement Award
 2004: Bram Stoker Award for Lifetime Achievement in the horror genre
 2008: Damon Knight Memorial Grand Master Award, literary fantasy and science fiction

He was "Co-Guest of Honor" at the 1976 World Fantasy Convention in New York City and one Guest of Honor at the 1997 55th World Science Fiction Convention in San Antonio, Texas.

Awards for particular works

 1967: Nebula Award (Novella): Behold the Man
 1972: August Derleth Fantasy Award: The Knight of the Swords
 1973: August Derleth Fantasy Award: The King of the Swords
 1974: British Fantasy Award (Best Short Story): The Jade Man's Eyes
 1975: August Derleth Fantasy Award: The Sword and the Stallion
 1976: August Derleth Fantasy Award: The Hollow Lands
 1977: Guardian Fiction Award: The Condition of Muzak
 1979: John W. Campbell Memorial Award for Best Science Fiction Novel: Gloriana
 1979: World Fantasy Award (Best Novel): Gloriana

Selected works

 The Best of Michael Moorcock (Tachyon Publications, 2009)
 The Elric of Melniboné series (1961–2022), including:
 The Dreaming City (1961)
 The Stealer of Souls (1963)
 Stormbringer (1965, revised 1977)
 Elric of Melniboné (1972)
 Elric: The Sailor on the Seas of Fate (1976)
 The Weird of the White Wolf (1977)
 The Vanishing Tower (1977)
 Elric at the End of Time (1981)
 The Fortress of the Pearl (1989)
 The Revenge of the Rose (1991)
 The Citadel of Forgotten Myths (2022)
 The Dorian Hawkmoon series (1967–1975), including:
 The Jewel in the Skull (1967)
 The Mad God's Amulet (1968)
 The Sword of the Dawn (1968)
 The Runestaff (1969)
 Count Brass (1973)
 The Champion of Garathorm (1973)
 The Quest for Tanelorn (1975)
 The Erekosë series (1970–1987), including:
 The Eternal Champion (1970)
 Phoenix in Obsidian, aka The Silver Warriors (1970)
 The Dragon in the Sword (1987)
 The Corum series (1971–1974), including:
 The Knight of the Swords (1971)
 The Queen of the Swords (1971)
 The King of the Swords (1971)
 The Bull and the Spear (1973)
 The Oak and the Ram (1973)
 The Sword and the Stallion (1974)
 Behold the Man (1969)
 The Time Dweller (1969)
 Sailing to Utopia, comprising:
 Flux (1962)
 The Ice Schooner (1966)
 The Black Corridor (1969)
 The Distant Suns (1975)
 The Chinese Agent (1970)
 The Russian Intelligence (1980)
 Michael Moorcock's Multiverse (1999) (graphic novel)
 The Metatemporal Detective (2007) (collection)
 A Nomad of the Time Streams:
 The Warlord of the Air (1971)
 The Land Leviathan (1974)
 The Steel Tsar (1981)
 The Dancers at the End of Time sequence (1972–76):
 An Alien Heat (1972)
 The Hollow Lands (1974)
 The End of All Songs (1976)
 Legends from the End of Time (1976)
 Gloriana (1978)
 My Experiences in the Third World War (1980)
 Mother London (1988)
 King of the City (2000)
 The Jerry Cornelius quartet of novels and shorter fiction:
 The Final Programme (1969)
 A Cure for Cancer (1971)
 The English Assassin (1972)
 The Condition of Muzak (1977)
 The Cornelius Quartet (compilation volume)
 The Adventures of Una Persson and Catherine Cornelius in the 20th Century (1976)
 The Lives and Times of Jerry Cornelius (1976)
 The Entropy Tango (1981)
 The Alchemist's Question (1984)
 Firing the Cathedral (novella) (2002)
 Pegging the President (novella) (2018)
 The Fracking Factory (novella) (2018 online)
 Modem Times 2.0 (novella) (2011)
and other stories in various anthologies
 The von Bek sequence:
 The War Hound and the World's Pain (1981)
 The Brothel in Rosenstrasse (1982)
 The City in the Autumn Stars (1986)
 The Pyat Quartet:
 Byzantium Endures (1981)
 The Laughter of Carthage (1984)
 Jerusalem Commands (1992)
 The Vengeance of Rome (2006)
 The Second Ether sequence:
 Blood: A Southern Fantasy (1994)
 Fabulous Harbours (1995)
 The War Amongst The Angels (1996)
 London Bone  (2001) – short stories
 The Elric/Oona Von Bek sequence:
 The Dreamthief's Daughter (2001)
 The Skrayling Tree (2003)
 The White Wolf's Son (2005)
 Doctor Who:
 The Coming of the Terraphiles (2010)
 The Sanctuary of the White Friars
The Whispering Swarm (2015)
The Woods of Arcady (2023)

Anthologies edited
As well as a series of Best SF Stories from New Wolds and The Traps of Time (Hart-Davis), Moorcock has also edited other volumes, including two bringing together examples of invasion literature:
 Before Armageddon (1975)
 England Invaded (1977)

Nonfiction
 Letters From Hollywood (US: General Distribution Services, 1986, 240 pp
 Wizardry and Wild Romance: a study of epic fantasy (UK: Gollancz, 1987), 160 pp., 
 Wizardry and Wild Romance: a study of epic fantasy, revised and expanded (US: MonkeyBrain Books, 2004), 206 pp., 
 Fantasy: The 100 Best Books (London: Xanadu Publications, 1988, ; Carroll & Graf, 1988), James Cawthorn and Moorcock
 Into the Media Web: Selected short non-fiction, 1956–2006, edited by John Davey, introduced by Alan Moore, (UK: Savoy Books, 2010) 718 pp
 London Peculiar and Other Nonfiction, Edited by Michael Moorcock and Allan Kausch, introduced by Iain Sinclair, (US: PM Press, 2012), 377pp

See also

Notes

References

Further reading
 Harris-Fain, Darren. British Fantasy and Science-Fiction Writers Since 1960, Gale Group, 2002, p. 293.
 Kaplan, Carter. "Fractal Fantasies of Transformation: William Blake, Michael Moorcock and the Utilities of Mythographic Shamanism". In New Boundaries in Political Science Fiction (Hassler, Donald M., & Clyde Wilcox, eds), University of South Carolina Press, 2008, pp. 35–52.
 Magill, Frank Northern. Survey of Modern Fantasy Literature, Volume 1, Salem Press, 1983, p. 489.

External links

General
  (official)
 
 Michael Moorcock at the Encyclopedia of Fantasy
 Michael Moorcock at the Encyclopedia of Science Fiction
 
 
 Fantastic Metropolis, co-edited by Michael Moorcock
 Michael Moorcock pages at RealityEnds
 Fantastic Fiction
 Michael Moorcock's Comics Compendium
 Michael John Moorcock at ComicBookDB.com

Nonfiction
 "Epic Pooh", by Michael Moorcock
 , by Michael Moorcock
 Also "Starship Stormtroopers" at the Stan Iverson Memorial Archives
 Michael Moorcock interviews Andrea Dworkin
 His tribute delivered at the Andrea Dworkin Commemorative Conference, Oxford University, Fri 7 Apr 2006 
 "If Hitler Had Won World War Two..." by Michael Moorcock. e*l* 25 (Vol. 5, No. 2), April 2005. (Earl Kemp, ed.)
 "A Child's Christmas in the Blitz" by Michael Moorcock. e*l* 35, December 2007 (Earl Kemp, ed.)

Interviews
 Interview with Michael Moorcock at Neth Space
 "The Bayley-Moorcock Letters, Part I"
 "The Bayley-Moorcock Letters, Part II"
 The Internet Review of Science Fiction interview (registration required)
 Richard Marshall, "Strange Connectionns - An interview with Michael Moorcock", 3:AM Magazine, 2002
 "Angry Old Men: Michael Moorcock on J.G. Ballard" . Interview on The Ballardian, 9 July 2007
 Dancing At the End of Time: Moorcock on Posthumanity.  Humanity+ interview with Woody Evans.
 Interview with Moorcock from Mythmakers & Lawbreakers 

1939 births
20th-century English novelists
21st-century English novelists
20th-century English musicians
21st-century English musicians
Anarchist writers
English anarchists
English fantasy writers
English lyricists
English science fiction writers
Hawkwind members
Living people
Nebula Award winners
Postmodern writers
Science fiction editors
Science Fiction Hall of Fame inductees
SFWA Grand Masters
World Fantasy Award-winning writers
Science fiction critics
British speculative fiction critics
English male novelists
Weird fiction writers
Pulp fiction writers
Authors of Sexton Blake
20th-century pseudonymous writers
21st-century pseudonymous writers